The eremomelas are a genus, Eremomela, of passerines in the cisticola family Cisticolidae. The genus was previously placed with the larger Old World warbler family Sylviidae prior to that genus being broken up into several families. The genus contains eleven species, all of which are found in sub-Saharan Africa. They occupy a range of habitats, from arid scrub to lowland tropical forest. The sexes are alike in size and plumage.

The genus was erected by the Swedish zoologist Carl Jakob Sundevall in 1850. The type species is the yellow-bellied eremomela (Eremomela icteropygialis). The word Eremomela comes from the Ancient Greek erēmos for "desert" and melos for "song" or "melody".

Species
The genus contains 11 species:
 Yellow-bellied eremomela (Eremomela icteropygialis)
 Salvadori's eremomela (Eremomela salvadori)
 Yellow-vented eremomela (Eremomela flavicrissalis)
 Senegal eremomela (Eremomela pusilla)
 Green-backed eremomela (Eremomela canescens)
 Green-capped eremomela (Eremomela scotops)
 Karoo eremomela (Eremomela gregalis)
 Burnt-necked eremomela (Eremomela usticollis)
 Rufous-crowned eremomela (Eremomela badiceps)
 Turner's eremomela (Eremomela turneri)
 Black-necked eremomela (Eremomela atricollis)

References

 
 
Taxonomy articles created by Polbot